Vörstetten is a town in the district of Emmendingen in Baden-Württemberg in Germany.

Mayors

 Karl Adolf Bolz (1945–1948)
 Karl Joseph Reisacher (1948–1957)
 Heinz Erhard Ritter (1957–1977)
 Karl Heinz Beck (1977–2009)
 Lars Brügner (since 2009)

Twin towns
Vörstetten is twinned with:

  L'Étrat, France
  La Tour-en-Jarez, France

References

Emmendingen (district)